I'm in Love is a song written by Bobby Ljunggren, Thomas G:son, Irini Michas and Peter Boström. The song was performed by Sanna Nielsen at Melodifestivalen 2011 in the semifinal in Gothenburg on 12 February 2011. The song received the most votes and reached the final in the Stockholm Globe Arena, where it ended up 4th with 114 points. The song also charted at Svensktoppen, entering on 17 April 2011. and stayed at the chart for four weeks before leaving the chart.

Track listing
 Digital Download
 I'm in Love (2:59)

SoundFactory Remixes 
 I'm in Love (SoundFactory Radio Mix) (4:22)
 I'm in Love (SoundFactory Paradise Anthem) (7:00)
 I'm in Love (SoundFactory Dub Mix) (7:00)

Chart performance

Weekly charts

Release history

References

2011 singles
English-language Swedish songs
Melodifestivalen songs of 2011
Sanna Nielsen songs
Songs written by Bobby Ljunggren
Songs written by Thomas G:son
Songs written by Peter Boström
2011 songs